Alfred James Bonwick (1 November 1883 – 4 September 1949) was a Liberal Party politician in the United Kingdom.

Background
He was born in London, the only son of James Bonwick and Elizabeth Fowler. In 1909 he married Florence Elizabeth Robinson. They had one daughter.

Professional career
He was a director of a bottle making company. He was Secretary of The Nation magazine. He was a business manager for a variety of newspapers owned by the Joseph Rowntree Social Service Trust.

Political career
He was Liberal candidate for the Unionist seat of the Chippenham division of Wiltshire at the 1922 General Election. He was a supporter of H. H. Asquith and an opponent of the Coalition Government of David Lloyd George. He was elected as Member of Parliament (MP) at the first attempt, defeating the Conservative MP George Terrell. This was the first time a Liberal had won Chippenham since the landslide election of 1906;

In 1923 he was appointed a Member of the Committee of Enquiry into Government Printing Establishments, on which he sat for 4 years. Against a national background that was witnessing a Liberal revival, Bonwick was re-elected in 1923 with an increased majority;

In May 1924 he was appointed as a Liberal Party Whip. At the 1924 general election he lost the seat to the Conservative Victor Cazalet, a loss that was in line with results elsewhere in the country;

After his election defeat he continued as Liberal prospective parliamentary candidate for Chippenham until December 1926 when he resigned, citing business pressures. He did not stand for parliament again. After the election, Lloyd George's influence in the party grew, particularly with regard to policy development. Lloyd George's new land policy was winning support within the party but Bonwick was opposed to it. In 1927, after Lloyd George became Liberal Party leader, former supporters of  Asquith formed the Liberal Council, to rally opposition to Lloyd George. Bonwick joined this group and was elected to its General Committee.

He served as a Justice of the peace.

External links 
 
 National Portrait Gallery http://www.npg.org.uk/collections/search/person/mp63369/alfred-james-bonwick

References

1883 births
1949 deaths
Liberal Party (UK) MPs for English constituencies
UK MPs 1922–1923
UK MPs 1923–1924